Mir Abdul Karim Nousherwani is a Pakistani politician who was a Member of the Provincial Assembly of Balochistan, between 1985 and May 2018.

Education and personal life
He was born in Kharan District.

He has received Islamic education and is an agriculturist by profession.

Political career
He was elected to the Provincial Assembly of Balochistan in 1985 Pakistani general election.

He ran for the seat of the Provincial Assembly of Balochistan as a candidate of IJI Constituency PB-33 (Kharan) in 1988 Pakistani general election but was unsuccessful. He received 6,206 votes and lost the seat to an independent candidate, Dost Muhammad Muhammad Hassani.

He was re-elected to the Provincial Assembly of Balochistan as a candidate of JWP Constituency PB-33 (Kharan) in 1990 Pakistani general election. He received 12,648 votes and defeated an independent candidate, Dost Muhammad Muhammad Hassani.

He was re-elected to the Provincial Assembly of Balochistan as a candidate of BNM from Constituency PB-33 (Kharan) in 1997 Pakistani general election. He received 11,103 votes and defeated a candidate of Balochistan National Party.

He was re-elected to the Provincial Assembly of Balochistan as a candidate of Pakistan Muslim League (Q) from Constituency PB-46 Kharan in 2013 Pakistani general election. He received 3,413 votes and defeated Sanaullah Baloch.

References

Living people
Balochistan MPAs 2013–2018
Pakistan Muslim League (Q) politicians
Balochistan MPAs 1985–1988
Balochistan MPAs 1997–1999
Balochistan MPAs 1990–1993
Year of birth missing (living people)